Timotheos Pavlou (born ) is a Cypriot footballer who plays as a right back for Cypriot First Division club Nea Salamina.

References

External links
 
 Timotheos Pavlou Statistics 2017-2018
  Timotheos Pavlou Statistics 2020-2021
 Timotheos Pavlou Statistics 2021-2022

1994 births
ASIL Lysi players
Association football defenders
Association football midfielders
Cypriot First Division players
Cypriot footballers
Digenis Oroklinis players
Living people
Nea Salamis Famagusta FC players
Othellos Athienou F.C. players